Frederik "Freek" Jan Georg de Jonge (born 30 August 1944) is a Dutch cabaret performer and writer.

Biography

Early life and career
De Jonge was born in Westernieland as son of a pastor. His family moved to Workum, and later to Zaandam and Goes. At age 11, De Jonge had his first performance on stage. After barely making it through high school, he studied cultural anthropology in Amsterdam. During his studies he met  and Johan Gertenbach, and they formed a group of comedy performers, .

In 1978, Neerlands Hoop became famous for their opposition against the participation of the Netherlands national football team in the football world cup in Argentina, though their show Bloed aan de Paal.

In 1979, Neerlands Hoop split up and De Jonge started a solo career of comedy performances. Starting in 1983, he also regularly performed on Dutch national television on New Year's Eve, humoristically looking back on the past year (the so-called "Oudejaarsconference").

Writer and musician
Besides performing in cabaret, De Jonge has written the novels Zaansch Veem (1987), Neerlands Bloed (1991) and Opa's Wijsvinger (1993). He has been the host of television shows and wrote two films: The Illusionist (1983) and De KKKomediant (1986). He also wrote a hip hop song with Dutch rapper Brainpower.

In 1994, De Jonge started to work with Nits. Under the name Frits, they performed covers of old Neerlands Hoop songs, translated Nits songs and newly written material. An album was released in 1995: Dankzij de Dijken. De Jonge continued to work with their keyboard player Robert Jan Stips: Stips released two albums: Gemeen Goed (1997) and Rapsodia (1998). A cover of Bob Dylan's "Death is not the End" reached the first place of the Dutch charts in 1997.

1997-present

From 1997 to October 2000, De Jonge was a columnist of the daily newspaper Parool.

In February 2004, he went to Iraq for a week to perform for the Dutch troops.

On 12 November 2005, he received the Groenman prize from the Genootschap Onze Taal; this is a society which works with the Dutch language.

Personal life
De Jonge is married to Hella Asser, daughter of Dutch writer Eli Asser.

Awards 

 Honorary medal from the municipality of Zaanstad (2020)
 Groninger of the Year (2017)
 Toon Hermans Award (2016)
 Association of Theater and Concertgebouw Directors' Oeuvre prize (2008)
 Groenman Language Prize (2005)

Shows

With Neerlands Hoop 
 Neerlands Hoop in Bange Dagen (1970)
 Live in Wadway (N.H.) (1971)
 Neerlands Hoop in Panama (1971)
 Plankenkoorts (1972)
 Weerzien in Panama (1973)
 Neerlands Hoop Express (1974)
 Ingenaaid of Gebonden (1975)
 Interieur (1977)
 Bloed aan de Paal (1978)
 Offsmboet Ippq Dpef (1979)

One man shows 
 De Komiek (1980)
 De Tragiek (1981)
 De Mars (1982)
 De Mythe (1983)
 De Openbaring (Oudejaarsconference) (1983)
 Stroman en Trawanten (with Willem Breuker Kollektief) (1983)
 Een Verademing (Oudejaarsconference) (1984)
 De Bedevaart (1985)
 De Finale (Oudejaarsconference) (1985)
 Het Damestasje (1986)
 De Pretentie (1987)
 De Goeroe en de Dissident (1988)
 De Volgende (1989)
 De Ontlading (Oudejaarsconference) (1989)
 The One (1990) (Engelstalig)
 Losse Nummers (1992)
 De Estafette (Oudejaarsconference) (1992)
 De Tol (1994)
 Frits (with Nits) (1994-1995)
 Langzame Liedjes (with Stips) (1996)
 Het Luik (Oudejaarsconference) and De Brand (Nieuwjaarsconference) (1996)
 Gemeen Goed (with Stips) (1997)
 Rapsodia (with Stips) (1998)
 Papa Razzia (Oudejaarsconference) (1998)
 De Conferencier, het Boekenweekgeschenk en de Leugen (2000)
 De Gillende Keukenmeid (Oudejaarsconference) (2000)
 Het Laatste Oordeel (Oudejaarsconference) (2001)
 Parlando (with the Metropole Orkest) (2002)
 De Stemming (Verkiezingsconference) (2003)
 De Vergrijzing (2004)
 Cordon Sanitaire (2005)
 Freek Doet de Deur Dicht (2005)
 Wat is er nog Heilig? (2006)
 De Stemming 2006 (Verkiezingsconference) (2006)
 De Toeschouwer (2007)
 De Laatste Lach (2008)

Books 
 Zaansch Veem (1987)
 De Brillenkoker (1990)
 Neerlands Bloed (1991)
 Opa's Wijsvinger (1993)
 De Rode Draad (1995)
 De Hoekvlag (2000)
 Door de Knieën (2004)
 Leven na de Dood (2004)
 De Toeschouwer (2006)

Movies 
 The Illusionist (1983)
 De KKKomediant (1986)

References

External links 

 
 Stemmingmakerij 2006
 Lyrics
 Portrait at De Harmonie
 Neerlands Hoop

1944 births
Living people
People from De Marne
Dutch cabaret performers
Dutch male film actors
Dutch male comedians
Dutch comedy musicians
Dutch male singers
20th-century Dutch people